The Wild Thornberrys is an American animated television series created by Arlene Klasky, Gábor Csupó, Steve Pepoon, David Silverman, and Stephen Sustarsic for Nickelodeon. The series portrays an American family of wildlife documentary filmmakers known as the Thornberrys, which consist of the British nature documentary television host Nigel, his wife and camera operator Marianne, their 16-year-old daughter Debbie, their younger daughter Eliza, their adopted son Donnie, and a chimpanzee named Darwin. The series focuses in particular on Eliza, who has a magical ability to communicate with animals. The Thornberry family travels to every continent and wildlife environment in the ComVee, a recreational vehicle equipped with safety mechanisms to handle any terrain or body of water, to document their journeys in detail, with typical episodes involving Eliza befriending an animal and subsequently finding herself in peril.

Originally pitched by Klasky Csupo as an adult animated sitcom for Fox, the series was then retooled as a family-friendly animated series for Nickelodeon and premiered on September 1, 1998, as the eleventh Nicktoon and the third overall produced by the studio following Rugrats and Aaahh!!! Real Monsters. It ran for 5 seasons containing 91 episodes in total, with the series finale airing on June 11, 2004.

The series' fourth season premiere, "The Origin of Donnie", is a television special focusing on Donnie Thornberry's life before he was adopted by the family. A feature film, The Wild Thornberrys Movie, in which Eliza embarks on a quest to save a cheetah cub from poachers, was theatrically released on December 20, 2002. Rugrats Go Wild, a crossover feature film with Nickelodeon's Rugrats, was released in theaters on June 13, 2003. Spin-off media include DVD releases and three video games.

Plot 
 
The series focuses around a nomadic family of documentary filmmakers known as the Thornberrys, famous for their televised wildlife studies, as they travel the world in the "Comvee", a large, amphibious, multifunctional overland motorhome which doubles as their base of operations. It primarily centers on the family's younger daughter Eliza, and her secret gift of being able to communicate with animals, which was bestowed upon her after having rescued a shaman masquerading as a trapped warthog.

The gift enables her to talk to the Thornberrys' pet chimpanzee Darwin. Together, the pair frequently venture through the wilderness, befriending many species of wild animals along the way, and discern moral truths and lessons through either their experiences or a particular animal species's lifestyle; often this means simply assisting the creatures by which they become acquainted in their difficulties.

Characters

Main
  (voiced by Lacey Chabert) is a 12-year-old girl and the youngest daughter of the Thornberrys. She has long red-orange hair that is usually worn in pigtails, and occasionally a ponytail, round eyeglasses, four big teeth connected by two braces, and freckles. She is able to communicate with animals, especially her chimpanzee sidekick Darwin. She must keep this gift secret or she will lose her powers (as revealed in the episode "Gift of Gab"). This happens during the film when Eliza reluctantly tells two poachers her secret in order to save Debbie. Luckily, after saving a herd of elephants from the same poachers later in the film, she is given her powers back. Despite her good intentions, she sometimes interferes with nature which causes more problems.
  (voiced by Tim Curry) is Eliza, Debbie, and Donnie's father and Marianne's husband. He is also the son of Radcliffe (also voiced by Curry) and Cordelia Thornberry (Lynn Redgrave), an aristocratic British couple. Born in the U.K. and having attended Harrow School near London, he travels around the world with his own family making wildlife documentaries. He is eccentric, enthusiastic, and cheerful even in the face of danger, and is also known for his exaggerated facial features and love of kippers which he offers frequently.
  (voiced by Jodi Carlisle) is Eliza, Debbie, and Donnie's mother and Nigel's wife. She is the daughter of Frank (Mel Brooks) and Sophie Hunter (Betty White). She mentions that she attended the University of California, Berkeley and once competed in a rodeo as revealed in "Rebel Without a Trunk".
  (voiced by Flea) is a feral boy adopted by the Thornberrys, who speaks mostly in gibberish and (as revealed in the 4-part TV film, "The Wild Thornberrys: The Origin of Donnie") was raised by an orangutan in Borneo after his parents, Michael and Lisa, who were old friends of the Thornberrys, were killed by poachers. Donnie's age is 4, turning 5 in "The Origin of Donnie".
  (voiced by Danielle Harris) is Eliza's older 16-year-old sister. After the events of the movie, she becomes the only family member to know about Eliza's power but is warned that she will be turned into a baboon if she ever tells anyone. Debbie dresses in 1990s clothing and has a long swept hairstyle. Unlike Eliza, Debbie doesn't like traveling and wants nothing more than to live in civilization and make friends with people her own age.
  (voiced by Tom Kane) is the Thornberrys' pet chimpanzee and Eliza's best friend. He usually wears a tank top with horizontal blue and white stripes (used to be Debbie's lucky tank top) and blue shorts. He speaks with a distinct, upper-class British accent. Although he isn't too fond of Debbie, the two do share the same preference to living in civilization over the wilderness. He also acts as the voice of reason for Eliza whenever she tried to interfere in nature.
 Kane also voices others.

Recurring
 Kip O'Donnell (voiced by Keith Szarabajka) is a poacher and The Thornberrys’ sworn enemy who poaches and kidnaps animals from above it, with his partner Neil Biederman (voiced by Michael Jeter & replaced by Jerry Sroka). Whenever they aren't poaching animals, they are conducting schemes to make easy money. They would eventually be apprehended by the authorities after causing an oil spill while attempting to steal oil from an oil tanker in the episode "You Otter Know."
 Tyler Tucker (voiced by Jonathan Taylor Thomas) is Eliza and Debbie's cousin. He is Marianne and Nigel's nephew through Marianne's sister Nancy Tucker née Hunter. He is a year older than Eliza but acts more immaturely than Eliza does. He doesn't really understand the dangers of living in the wild. He's a know-it-all but generally has a good head on his shoulders, and he cares about his cousins Debbie, Eliza, and Donnie. His parents are Dennis (voiced by Martin Mull) and Nancy Tucker (voiced by Mary Kay Place).
 Shane G. (voiced by Christopher Masterson) is a pop superstar who travels with the Thornberry Family for five episodes while they are filming in Alaska. The Foundation orders Nigel and Marianne to take him with the family to promote Wildlife preservation among young people and Shane's fans. Both Eliza and Debbie gain a crush on the him, however Debbie loses interest when Shane shows to have more similarities with Eliza than herself.
 Santusa (voiced by Tia Texada) is a supremely annoying llama whom Eliza befriended in the Andes.
 Bim (voiced by Greg Ellis) is a Koala who has a British accent and befriended by Eliza, Darwin, & Donnie.
 Shango (voiced by Bradley Pierce) is an African Elephant who Eliza first met.
 Phaedra (voiced by Jane Wiedlin) is a female African Elephant who appears in the episode, "Forget Me Not", and who Eliza and Darwin were riding at the beginning of The Wild Thornberrys Movie.
 Zita (voiced by Andrea Thompson) is an African Elephant who was Rebecca's daughter and the mother of Shango, from the episode, Forget Me Not.
 Mali (voiced by Christina Pickles) is an African Elephant who was Zita's aunt and Phadera's daughter, when Eliza helps her.
 Juka (voiced by Marquise Wilson) is the leader of the Maasai legend between his wise Grandfather Makai (voiced by Courtney B. Vance & replaced by Steve Harris)
 Ben (voiced by David Gallagher) is a friend of Eliza's that Debbie teases her for having a crush on.
 Franz Fensterkopt (voiced by Bronson Pinchot)
 Dr. Jomo (voiced by Brock Peters) is a police officer who is a friend of Nigel Thornberry.
 Sri Mayasandra (voiced by Alan Henry Brown) is a scientist who had found Donnie in the TV special.
 Baru (voiced by Cara DeLizia) is a young Proboscis monkey who helps Eliza get back to her family, and his father, Baduk (voiced by Dwight Schultz).
 Lugan (voiced by Maureen Quinn), who was in the TV special.
 Saiful (voiced by Pamela Adlon), which was in the TV special. and Adlon voiced Tano, a Cheetah Cub who Eliza tries to help find and who she, Darwin and Donnie help try to find his mother in the episode, "Cheetahs Never Prosper".
 Shi Shou (voiced by Dionne Quan) is a baby panda, and Mei-Mei (voiced by Bai Ling), a mother panda.
 Conal (voiced by Michael Gough) is a golden eagle, and his wife Brianag (voiced by Laraine Newman).

Guest stars
 Arthur Burghardt as Big Buffalo, an African buffalo from the episode "The Kung and I" and a Rhino from the Pilot episode.
 Eartha Kitt and Sheryl Lee Ralph as the Lionesses in the episode "Flood Warning".
 Bill Cobbs as the Chief in the episode "Dinner with Darwin".
 Phil LaMarr, Jackie Harris and Paul Greenberg are Tuku, Pippo, Barno, the three mysterious prankster marmosets.
 LaMarr also voices the Steamboat Captain in the episode "Matadi or Bust".
 David Huddleston as a sea tortoise in the episode "Gold Fever".
 David Eccles as a hippo in the episode "Matadi or Bust".
 Georg Stanford Brown as Kito, the leader jaguar from the episode "Temple of Eliza".
 Marabina Jaimes as Raamba, a jaguar who Eliza helped out of the pit in the episode "Temple of Eliza".
 Jeffrey Lincon and Sabrina Wiener as the jaguar cubs in the episode "Temple of Eliza".
 Erik Von Detten as an adolescent jaguar in the episode "Temple of Eliza"..
 Jeff Bennett as an officer in the episode "Vacant Lot".
 Jess Harnell as a tortoise and a marsh deer in the episode "Vacant Lot".
 Rosslynn Taylor Jordan as a tapir in the episode "Vacant Lot".
 Candi Milo as Emily, a female wombat from the episode, "Chew if by Sea".
 Milo also voices a capybara, a parrot, a civet cat, a mousedeer, and others.
 Jeremy Sisto as the Radio announcer and the D.J.
 Jessi Corti as the two crocodiles in the episode "Only Child".
 Susanna Voltaire, Russi Taylor, Melissa Fahn are Anna, Igna, and Katrina in "On the Right Track".
 William H. Macy as Skoot, a male reindeer who Eliza raced with in "On the Right Track".
 Bill Fagerbakke as Dank, a black reindeer who appeared in On the Right Track.
 Tom Kenny as Joey, a baby Kangaroo who Eliza babysits in Pal Joey.
 Gregg Berger and S. Scott Bullock are Lemke and Snaga, the Tasmanian devils in the episode "Pal Joey".
 Berger also voices a lion and a warthog in the episode "Flood Warning". A water buffalo and a doctor in the episode "The Dragon and the Professor".
 Bullock also voices a python and a forest hog
 Cree Summer as Rosie, a "teenage" Asian elephant in "Rebel Without a Trunk".
 Danny Cooksey as Wanuug, a polar bear who appeared in Polar Opposites.
 David Ogden Stiers as Karroo, an Aye-aye from "Luck Be an Aye-aye".
 Ron Fassler, Anne Lambton, & Jimmie Wood are  Tak a little rat, Sheeba the eye patch wearing cat, & Bone, the three legged dog who helped Eliza find the Bangaboo in The Great Bangaboo.
 Marion Ross as Rebecca, an elephant whom Eliza saved in Forget Me Not. She was originally saved by Nigel from poachers many years ago. At the end of the episode, the elephant dies of natural causes which makes Eliza cry after she passes away and her daughter Zita takes over the herd.
 Robert Morse as Jake, a male tortoise who Eliza helped in Two's Company.
 Phyllis Diller as Samantha, a female tortoise who Eliza helped in Two's Company.
 Kelly McGillis & Peter Onorati are Winema and Pava, the leader Gray Wolves that appeared in the episode, Pack of Thornberrys.
 Chris Demetral as Mato, a Gray Wolf who appeared in the episode, Pack of Thornberrys.
 Bill Brochtrup as Collin, a Common dolphin who Eliza swam with in the episode, Hello, Dolphin!.
 Jane Goodall as Herself, appears in the episode, The Trouble with Darwin.

Episodes

Production 
The Wild Thornberrys was produced by Klasky Csupo. It was initially pitched as an adult animated sitcom under the name, Nigel Thornberry's Animal World, and was to be co-produced by Fox Animation for Fox, but it was ultimately rejected. It was then picked up by Nickelodeon under its own animation studio and was retooled as a family-oriented series with Nigel's youngest daughter Eliza (originally named Alex) being promoted to the main protagonist role. According to Eryk Casemiro, SVP of Creative Affairs at Klasky-Csupo Productions at the time of the series production, she was originally designed to look "quite frankly, very ugly" in order to contradict the stereotype that all young heroines are beautiful. However, her design was later retooled to look "cuter" at the request of Nickelodeon. It premiered on September 1, 1998, and was the first Nicktoon to exclusively use 22-minute stories (episodes of other Nicktoons usually featured two 10 – 11-minute stories, using 22-minute stories only on occasion).

The series was designed to have a focus on parents, after focus groups run by Klasky and Csupo uncovered that children were talking about the real struggles of the parent-child relationship; this was opposed to Nickelodeon's view of only featuring kids in children's programming. It was also designed with the potential of being used in science curriculums. To accomplish this, the production crew hired a specialist who did research on different regions of the world, different cultures, and different species of animals, all of which were provided to the writers to help them develop ideas for episodes.

Broadcast
The show aired in reruns on "Nick on CBS" for two years from September 14, 2002, to March 6, 2004. The show aired on Nicktoonsters in the United Kingdom.

Home media
Nickelodeon released all five seasons on DVD in Region 1 via Amazon.com through its CreateSpace Manufacture-on-demand program in 2010. Season 1 was released on June 24, 2010, and Seasons 2 through 5 were released on December 1, 2010.

On February 16, 2011, Shout! Factory announced that it had acquired the rights to release the series on home media and would be releasing Season 1 on DVD on May 17, 2011. Season 1 was released on May 17, 2011, followed by Season 2, Part 1 on November 8, 2011. Season 2, Part 2 was released on April 24, 2012. Season 2, Part 3 was released on January 15, 2013, as a Shout Select title. Season 3 was released on June 11, 2013, as a Shout Select title. Season 4 and Season 5 were released in a box set on September 10, 2013, as a Shout Select title.

On December 1, 2015, Shout! Factory released The Wild Thornberrys: The Complete Series on DVD in Region 1.

In Australia, all 5 seasons have been released via Beyond Home Entertainment. A 13-disc set titled The Wild Thornberrys: The Essential Episodes was released on June 3, 2015.

♦ – Shout! Factory select title, sold exclusively through Shout's online store.

Films
The franchise was extended through three movies (one television film and two theatrical films), which were released toward the end of the series' run:
 The Origin of Donnie (2001): This television film prequel discovers Donnie's life before he was found by the Thornberrys.
 The Wild Thornberrys Movie (2002): This theatrical film earned an Academy Award nomination for Best Original Song.
 Rugrats Go Wild (2003): This theatrical film was also the final Rugrats film, and a crossover between Rugrats and The Wild Thornberrys.

Video games
A video game based on the television series titled The Wild Thornberrys: Animal Adventures was released only for PlayStation on November 8, 2000. During this time, another game was released, The Wild Thornberrys: Rambler on PC and Game Boy Color on August 7, 2000, and November 2000 respectively. The Wild Thornberrys Chimp Chase was released only for the Game Boy Advance on October 1, 2001. Characters from the series also appear in the Nickelodeon crossover games Nicktoons Racing, Nickelodeon Party Blast, Nicktoons: Freeze Frame Frenzy, Nickelodeon All-Star Brawl (where Nigel is voicced by Jim Meskimen), and Nickelodeon Extreme Tennis.

Reception

Box office performance

Critical response

Common Sense Media gave the series a rating of 5 stars, praising it for its ability to encourage young viewers to be empathetic toward animals, to want to find out about other cultures and ways of life, and to understand the vastness and diversity of the world. Knight Ridder called the series "sympathetic". The Native Voice complimented the series on its commitment to fun, adventure, detail, accuracy, and honesty.

Accolades 

|-
| rowspan=2|1999
| Casting Society of America Artios Award for Best Casting for Animated Voiceover
| Barbara Wright
| 
|-
| Young Artist Award for Best Performance in a Voice Over in a Feature or TV - Best Young Actress
| Sabrina Wiener
| 
|-
| rowspan=4|2000
| Casting Society of America Artios Award for Best Casting for Animated Voiceover - Television
| Barbara Wright
| 
|-
| Environmental Media Award for Children's Animated
| The Wild Thornberrys episode "You Otter Know"
| 
|-
| Genesis Award for Television - Children's Programming - Animated
| The Wild Thornberrys episode "Hunting by Numbers"
| 
|-
| YoungStar Award for Best Young Voice Over Talent
| Lacey Chabert
| 
|-
| rowspan=5|2001
| Burbank International Children's Film Festival Award for Best Tele-Feature Animation
| Joseph Scott, Dean Criswell, and Ron Noble for "The Origin Of Donnie"
| 
|-
| Daytime Emmy Award for Outstanding Children's Animated Program
| The Wild Thornberrys
| 
|-
| Environmental Media Award for Children's Animated Category
| The Wild Thornberrys episode "Happy Campers"
| 
|-
| Genesis Award for Television - Children's Programming - Animated
| The Wild Thornberrys for multiple episodes
| 
|-
| Genesis Award for Television - Children's Programming - Animated
| The Wild Thornberrys episode "Forget Me Not"
| 
|-
| 2002
| Environmental Media Award for Children's Animated Category
| The Wild Thornberrys episode "The Trouble With Darwin"
| 
|-
| 2003
| Casting Society of America Artios Award for Best Casting for Animated Voice Over, Television
| Barbara Wright
| 
|-
| 2004
| NAMIC Vision Award in Children's Category
| The Wild Thornberrys
| 
|}

References

External links
 
 

 
Nicktoons
1990s American animated television series
2000s American animated television series
1990s Nickelodeon original programming
1998 American television series debuts
2004 American television series endings
2000s Nickelodeon original programming
American children's animated adventure television series
American children's animated comedy television series
Animated television series about apes
Animated television series about children
Animated television series about families
English-language television shows
Environmental television
Television series about television
Television series by Klasky Csupo
Television series created by Arlene Klasky
Television series created by Gábor Csupó
Television series created by Steve Pepoon
Television shows adapted into films
Television shows adapted into video games